The 1915 Kentucky Wildcats football team represented the University of Kentucky as a member of the Southern Intercollegiate Athletic Association (SIAA) during the 1915 college football season. Led by first-year head coach John J. Tigert, the Wildcats compiled an overall record of 6–1–1 with a mark 2–1–1 in SIAA play.

Schedule

References

Kentucky
Kentucky Wildcats football seasons
Kentucky Wildcats football